Ted N. "Twig" Branch (born 22 April 1957) retired as a vice admiral in the United States Navy on 1 October 2016, after serving the last three years of his 37-year career as the Deputy Chief of Naval Operations for information warfare. In that capacity, he was the resource sponsor for the N2N6 portfolio which includes program investments for assured command and control, battlespace awareness, and integrated fires. He was the Navy's Chief Information Officer, the Director of Navy Cybersecurity, the leader of the Information Warfare Community, and the Director of Naval Intelligence. Branch was questioned by the Department of Justice regarding the Glenn Defense Marine Asia investigation in November 2013 and his access to classified information was suspended by the Secretary of the Navy. After a three-year investigation, Branch was cleared of all charges.

Education
 Bachelor of Science, United States Naval Academy, 1979
 Master of international relations, Naval War College

Military career
Branch was a career naval aviator, specializing in A-7 Corsairs and F/A-18 Hornets. He has flown combat missions over Grenada, Lebanon, Bosnia-Herzegovina, and Iraq. He has also served on the Joint Staff at the Pentagon.

In January 2010, as the Commander of the Carl Vinson Strike Group, Branch led the initial US Navy response to the Haiti earthquake.

From February 2011 to July 2013, Branch served as the Commander of Naval Air Force, U.S. Atlantic Fleet, headquartered in Norfolk, Virginia. In that role he was responsible for manning, training, and equipping all elements of Naval Air Force, Atlantic – over 1000 aircraft, 40 thousand personnel, and six nuclear-powered aircraft carriers. While there, he also established the Interoperability Coordination Office for the United Kingdom's new aircraft carriers and the introduction of the F-35 aircraft.

On 16 May 2013, Branch was nominated by Secretary of Defense Chuck Hagel to become the Director of Naval Intelligence (DNI) and the Deputy Chief of Naval Operations (DCNO)for Information Dominance (later renamed Information Warfare). He was confirmed by the United States Senate in July 2013 and promoted to Vice Admiral (O-9).

While serving in the DCNO/DNI roles, he also took on the position of Directory of Navy Cybersecurity, becoming the Navy's leading proponent for cybersecurity. In this role, he stood up a year-long matrixed organization called Task Force Cyber Awakening to develop and implement Navy's cybersecurity strategy. That group developed the CYBERSAFE program to design and build in cyber resiliency, and inculcate an enhanced culture of cybersecurity throughout the U.S. Navy. When the Task Force completed their efforts, he stood up the Navy Cybersecurity Division within N2N6 so the process of instituting CYBERSAFE and a culture of cybersecurity could continue.

Corruption scandal

On 8 November 2013, the Navy suspended Branch's access to classified information in connection with a Department of Justice investigation involving Singapore-based defense contractor, Glenn Defense Marine Asia. The investigation as to Branch involves a non-criminal accusation of "inappropriate conduct" associated with his acceptance of gifts from Glenn Marine during his tour as commanding officer of USS Nimitz on a western Pacific/Persian Gulf deployment in 2005. Although Branch remained in his post during the lengthy Justice Department investigation, his access to classified information remained suspended, relegating him to unclassified duties.

In September 2015, the Navy formally nominated Rear Admiral Elizabeth L. Train to succeed Branch as Director of Naval Intelligence.

In January 2016, the Washington Post reported that Branch was still functioning in his role, yet was "barred from reading, seeing or hearing classified information since November 2013", due to the suspension tied to the investigation.

On 1 April 2016, the Navy Times reported that the Navy had withdrawn Elizabeth Train's nomination to succeed Branch in favor of Vice Admiral Jan E. Tighe, previously commander of the Navy's Fleet Cyber Command and Commander, U.S. Tenth Fleet.  Vice Admiral Tighe relieved Branch as Deputy CNO for Information Warfare/Director of Naval Intelligence in July 2016.  Branch's access to classified information remained suspended until he retired.

Both the Navy and the Department of Justice cleared Branch of any wrongdoing in September 2017 and declined to prosecute Branch after a three-year investigation that resulted in no charges being brought.

Military awards and aecorations

References

External links

 Official Navy Biography

United States Navy vice admirals
United States Naval Academy alumni
Recipients of the Legion of Merit
People from Long Beach, Mississippi
Living people
Directors of the Office of Naval Intelligence
1957 births